Patrick Wichmann (born 13 February 1972) is a German sailor, together with Karl Haist (helmsman) and Martin Zeileis (midperson), Wichmann won second place during the 2012 European Soling Championship. With this team he became the Best Europeans in this series.

Reference

1972 births
Living people
German male sailors (sport)
Sportspeople from Hanover
Soling class sailors